General Joseph Zoundeiko (or Zindeko) (died 11 February 2017) was the leader of military wing of the Central African rebel militia alliance, Séléka. 

Born in Tiringoulou, Vakaga, he worked as a guard and tracker, securing parklands on the northwestern borders of the country from poachers from neighboring Chad and South Sudan. He joined the CAR army in 1997 and was promoted to lieutenant. In 2006, he joined the UFDR rebel group. President Djototia later promoted him to major, then colonel and brigadier general. He was appointed on May 9, 2014 by a Seleka congress that gathered more than 500 officers and officials in N'Délé. He has rejected the ceasefire deal agreed between Seleka and the largely Christian Anti-balaka militias on July 24, 2014, saying the deal had been negotiated without proper input from the military wing. After the dissolution of Seleka, he became head of the Popular Front for the Renaissance of the Central African Republic (FPRC) and often fought with the largely Fulani and rival ex-Seleka militia, the Union for Peace in the Central African Republic (UPC) led by General Ali Darrassa. The FPRC reported on 12 February 2017 that Zoundeiko was killed when a UN helicopter fired on fighters advancing towards the town of Bambari the day before.

References

20th-century births
2017 deaths
Central African Republic Muslims
People killed in the Central African Republic Civil War
People of the Central African Republic Civil War
Central African Republic military personnel
People from Vakaga
Year of birth missing
African warlords